John Vern Wall (March 13, 1938 – April 22, 2010) was an educator and political figure in Saskatchewan. He represented Swift Current from 1995 to 1999 in the Legislative Assembly of Saskatchewan as a New Democratic Party (NDP) member.

He was born in Swift Current, Saskatchewan and was educated at the Moose Jaw Normal School and at the University of Saskatchewan, receiving a BEd in 1968. Wall taught elementary school from 1957 to 1967 and then was a junior high principal until his retirement in 1988. He was defeated by Brad Wall (no relation) when he ran for reelection to the assembly in 1999. He died in 2010.

References 

1938 births
2010 deaths
People from Swift Current
Saskatchewan New Democratic Party MLAs